Benin is a former French colony in western Africa. French is the official language, and is usually used in literature, along with indigenous languages. Folk stories and feminist works hold high significance in Benin literature.

Oba of Benin 

The modern Republic of Benin (La République du Bénin) is not ruled by a king. The Oba of Benin is active in modern times as a literary figure in theater and literature. Historically, the ruler of the Kingdom of Dahomey was known as the Oba of Benin. In the oral tradition of Benin, the Oba (King) of Benin is a demigod personified, as a cultural symbol, a spiritual icon, and a political figure. During the period of the Kingdom of Dahomey, the Oba entered any occasion with his vassals, who would sing to demonstrate his mythical status. These deified honorific titles and ceremonies elevated the Oba to an idealized status. The mythic overtones of the Oba of Benin symbolize not only the sanctity of the royal power, but also the religious and cultural symbols of Benin. Threatened by political turmoil and commercial adventures in the white world, the Benin Empire has been in a turbulent era for a long time. As a representative of the male spirit, the Oba maintains the social order of Benin in literature, which is organized around the power of God. Historical figures, as the common point of Nigerian literature, are further expanded from the oral sources of historical sources. Written and oral literature simultaneously, and through the study of drama, convey that the Oba in Benin plays a pivotal role in the rich cultural heritage of indigenous people.

Feminist literature 
Patriarchy exists in the contemporary social structure of Benin society in southern Nigeria. To some extent, women are placed at a disadvantage. There are obvious discriminatory cultural customs in the social environment of Benin. In ancient times, the kingdom of Benin was ruled by an Oba (national leader/king of the country). Beninese in Nigeria have a tradition of primogeniture, therefore Oba has always been held by men, with the exception for Iyoba of Benin, Beninese women have been in a lower social class since ancient times. The Oba of Benin had a wife and many concubines, and these women could be given as gifts or commodities to the loyal sheikhs. In the classical patriarchal Beninese society, male exploitation and oppression of women was ubiquitous. Even in modern Beninese society, which has recognized occurrences of female genital mutilation, the number of incidences has not decreased.

The practice of widowhood is another patriarchal trait that persecutes African women for their feudal superstitions. In Benin, if a man dies prematurely, his widow will be summoned and asked to prove her innocence. The widow of the deceased is required to shave her head, sleep on the floor with the body for a few days, drink the water used to bathe the deceased and swear on his forehead. If the widow unfortunately dies in the process, then she will be considered guilty for the death of her husband. However, a widower who lost his wife was not required to perform this ritual. Instead, in some areas of Edo, the widower's family and friends would find another woman for him to sleep with until his wife was buried. In this way his wife's spirit would not come to disturb his sleep. In the 1980s, women in Africa began to give themselves a voice by writing articles, and a large number of female writers and theorists centered on women emerged. Many outstanding writers and works have criticized patriarchal practices and supported women's political empowerment. West African literature and popular art forms are often linked to local women-centered theories, which can further achieve broader emancipation.

In historical Benin literature, most of the male images are bold, independent of the main power, and occupy the dominant position in the society. Women are often dominated by their roles, engaged in simple work, and mainly bear family responsibilities. With the rise of women's consciousness, many works from the perspective of women in the French-speaking Republic of Benin reflect the oppression of women's roles, and great dissatisfaction with the unequal relationship between men and women.

Language in literature 
As a former French colony, Benin uses French as the official language of government and education. However, the widespread use of French as an official language is partly due to the restricted use of the local languages. In social and cultural aspects, language influences the choice and acceptance of writing conventions. Most African languages are ethnic minority languages, characterized by limited areas of use and inadequate description. The lack of formalized grammar and vocabulary and standardized orthography causes the language to be underdeveloped, which limits its use in society and in literary works, and promotes widespread use of the French language. The French language is mostly taught in school. The low education rate of Benin leads to the frequency of the local Benin language in literary works being lower than French works. In 1972, the government of Benin issued the Le Discours (Discourse) program, a government document calling for the establishment of a National Linguistic Institute to promote the development of all Beninese languages. As a follow-up to this policy, the National Linguistic Commission was established in 1974, and "National Linguistic Training Seminars" were held from 1979 until the 1980s. The seminars established an alphabet for the Beninese, officially recognized 19 Beninese people, and set up local sub-commissions for the development of orthography in various locations. In 1984, the National Linguistic Training Seminars were renamed the National Center for Applied Linguistics.

Le Discours set up the Division d'alphabétisation et la presse rurale, which works to enhance the literacy of Beninese. At the same time, the government also created a literacy department for adults. By the 1990s, changes in Benin's regime led to a concomitant change in language policy. At a national conference held in February 1990, attendees almost unanimously agreed to adopt legislation in both French and Beninese. This conference officially selected Fon, Yoruba, Baatonum, Dendi, Aja and Ditammari for formal education and adult literacy. However, these six languages are still not truly national languages in Benin.

Beninese folktales and oral literature 

Folk stories are an important cultural tradition in Benin. Literature in Benin had a strong oral tradition long before French became the dominant language. The Beninese folk story is the expression of the Beninese people's experience of the world.

Most African civilizations and traditions have been transmitted through oral communication. Benin has a long and rich oral tradition that can be traced back centuries. Benin's oral literature is not limited to stories; it also comprises riddles, pins, tongue-twisters, proverbs, recitation, chants and songs. Storytellers interpret the folklore of past tribes in these ways as well. Professor Dan Ben-Amos of the University of Pennsylvania believes that story-telling, one of the most important art forms in Africa, is a cultural legacy that perpetuates tribal history and mythology through oral narration to the next generation.

In contemporary times, oral literature is gradually dying out. Although linguists and anthropologists in Benin have collected as many oral stories as possible through visits to local families and villages in Benin, they have not been able to prevent the disappearance of many stories. Due to the strict assimilation policy in the French colonial system, use of the Beninese languages is declining. Although the local Benin language has a formal income system, the oral literature of Benin has rarely been printed or transcribed. The colonial education system, urbanization, increasing economic difficulties, and foreign TV programs have all led to the gradual extinction of local oral literature and folk stories in Benin.

From oral to written literature 
Félix Couchoro wrote the first Beninese novel, L'Esclave, in 1929. This was the first written literary work in the history of Beninese literature. Although the book is not widely known, it has symbolic significance in Benin's literary history. L'Esclave represents the development from oral description to written record. Another milestone in the development of African literature is Doguicimi by Beninese writer, Paul Hazoumé, which has been described as "the first historical novel of African literature". Kusum Aggarwal from the University of Delhi has said that Doguicimi conveys the perspectives of the colonized people on the colonies through ethnography, and she believes the book represents an effort by Africans to reflect on themselves.

Notable Beninese writers
Olympe Bhêly-Quénum
Jean Pliya
Colette Senami Agossou Houeto
Florent Couao-Zotti
Richard Dogbeh
Adelaide Fassinou
Paulin J. Hountondji
Paulin Joachim
José Pliva

See also
List of Beninese writers
Music of Benin

References

 Aggarwal, K. (2015). Colonial ethnography as a strategy for self-writing: The case of Paul Hazoumé's Doguicimi (1938). International Journal Of Francophone Studies, 18(2), 171–190.  
 Ben-Amos, D. (1967). Story Telling in Benin. African Arts, 1(1), 54–59.  
 Conrad, J. The Scramble for Africa | StJohns. Joh.cam.ac.uk.
 Corso, P. (2000). Why Goats Smell Bad and Other Stories from Benin. Journal of American Folklore, 113(447), 111–112. 
 Devy, G.N., Davis, G.V., & Chakravarty, K.K. (Eds.). (2014). Knowing Differently: The Challenge of the Indigenous (1st ed.). Routledge India. 
 Hazoumé,P.(1938). Doguicimi.
 Mama, R. (1998). "The dance of poverty" and Beninese folktales. Journal of Popular Culture, 32(2), 5–10. 
 Mnenuka, A. (2017). Exploring Modernity in African Orature. Qucosa.
 Newell, S. (Ed.). (2017). Writing African women : Gender, popular culture and literature in west Africa. Bloomsbury Academic & Professional.
 Osezua, O. C., & Agholor, H. N. (2019). Patriarchy, Cultural Prejudices and Spousal Violence in the Ancient City of Benin of Southern Nigeria. Journal of International Women's Studies, 20(7), COVX+. 
 OYEWOLE, C. O. (2018). PATRIARCHY AND OPPRESSION OF FEMALE CHARACTERS IN SELECTED BENINESE female NOVELS
 Trudell, B., & Reeder, J. (2006, June). Discourses of authority and stakeholder perspective: Processes of language development in Benin. In Conference on Languages and Education in Africa, University of Oslo (pp. 19–22).
 Vignondé, J.-N. (1985). Autour de "L'esclave" de Felix Couchoro. Research in African Literatures, 16(4), 556–563.